Clonfert is a small village in east County Galway, Ireland, halfway between Ballinasloe and Portumna. The village gives its name to the Diocese of Clonfert. Clonfert Cathedral is one of the eight cathedral churches of the Church of Ireland, Diocese of Limerick and Killaloe. The cathedral of the Roman Catholic Diocese of Clonfert is located in Loughrea and is home to the Shrine of Our Lady of Clonfert. Three churches lay in this parish, St. Brendan's Eyrecourt, St. Francis Meelick and Clonfert. Its current parish priest (2021) is Fr. Declan McInerney and its bishop Michael Duignan.

Notable people
Maeineann of Clonfert

See also
 List of towns and villages in Ireland

External links

Clonfert Cathedral at Ireland West

Towns and villages in County Galway
Romanesque architecture in Ireland